Sander Gillé and Joran Vliegen were the defending champions, but chose not to participate this year.

Santiago González and Andrés Molteni won the title, defeating Jonathan Erlich and Andrei Vasilevski in the final, 6–1, 6–2.

Seeds

Draw

Draw

References

External links
Main Draw

Astana Open - Doubles